The 2018–19 Norfolk State Spartans men's basketball team represented Norfolk State University during the 2018–19 NCAA Division I men's basketball season. The Spartans, led by sixth-year coach Robert Jones, played their home games at the Joseph G. Echols Memorial Hall in Norfolk, Virginia as members of the Mid-Eastern Athletic Conference. They finished the season 22–14 overall, 14–2 in MEAC play to finish in first place, and win the MEAC regular season championship. As the No. 1 seed in the MEAC tournament, they were upset in the championship game by No. 3 seed North Carolina Central. As a conference champion who failed to win their conference tournament, and not selected to participate in the NCAA tournament, they were awarded an automatic bid to the NIT. Given a No. 8 seed in the Alabama bracket, they upset No. 1 seed Alabama in the first round, then were defeated in the second round by No. 4 seed Colorado.

Previous season
The Spartans finished the 2017–18 season 14–19, 11–5 in MEAC play to finish in a tie for fourth place. As the No. 5 seed in the MEAC tournament, they defeated Maryland Eastern Shore before losing to North Carolina A&T in the quarterfinals.

Roster

Schedule and results

|-
!colspan=9 style=|Exhibition

|-
!colspan=9 style=| Regular season

|-
!colspan=9 style=| MEAC regular season

|-
!colspan=9 style=| MEAC tournament

|-
!colspan=9 style="|NIT

References

Norfolk State Spartans men's basketball seasons
Norfolk State
Norfolk State Spartans
Norfolk State Spartans
Norfolk State